Scopula hanna is a moth of the  family Geometridae. It is found in Japan.

References

Moths described in 1878
hanna
Moths of Japan